Since Jacques Anquetil had won in 1957, he was unable to repeat it, due to illness, tiredness and struggle within the French team. For the 1961 Tour de France, he asked the team captain Marcel Bidot to make a team that would only ride for him, and Bidot agreed. Anquetil announced before the race that he would take the yellow jersey as leader of the general classification on the first day, and wear it until the end of the race in Paris.
Gastone Nencini, who won the previous edition, did not enter in 1961, but Graziano Battistini, his teammate and runner-up of 1960, started the race as leader of the Italian team. If the French team would again have internal struggles, the Italian team could emerge as the winner.
The Spanish team had two outsiders, José Pérez Francés and Fernando Manzaneque. The last outsider was Charly Gaul, winner of the 1958 Tour de France, who rode in the mixed Luxembourg-Swiss team. He considered his teammates so weak that he did not seek their help, and rode the race on his own.
Raymond Poulidor was convinced by his team manager Antonin Magne that it would be better to skip the Tour, because the national team format would undermine his commercial value.

Start list

By team

By rider

By nationality

References

1961 Tour de France
1961